Maryport is a civil parish in the Borough of Allerdale in Cumbria, England.  It contains 57 listed buildings that are recorded in the National Heritage List for England.  Of these, two are listed at Grade II*, the middle of the three grades, and the others are at Grade II, the lowest grade.  The parish contains the town of Maryport and the village of Flimby.  The site of Maryport has been a haven since the Roman era.  It was developed as a coal port in 1748–49 when the town was laid out on a grid plan, and the town grew further following the arrival of the railway in 1845.  The work of the port declined during the 20th century.  Most of the listed buildings are houses, shops and public houses in the town dating from the 18th and 19th centuries.  The other listed buildings include a medieval pele tower, farmhouses, a naval club, a lighthouse, churches, and a museum that originated as a naval gunnery training centre.


Key

Buildings

Notes and references

Notes

Citations

Sources

Lists of listed buildings in Cumbria
Listed